"Viszlát nyár" ("Summer, Gone") is a song performed by Hungarian heavy metal band AWS. The song was released as a digital download on 21 October 2017 through EDGE Records and was written by Dániel Kökényes, Bence Brucker, Áron Veress, Soma Schiszler, and Örs Siklósi. It represented Hungary in the Eurovision Song Contest 2018 in Lisbon, Portugal.

Eurovision Song Contest

AWS was confirmed as one of the entrants in A Dal 2018, the Hungarian national selection for the Eurovision Song Contest 2018, on 6 December 2017. They went on to compete in the second heat on 27 January 2018, and advanced to the semi-finals through the jury vote. They later competed in the second semi-final on 17 February 2018 and were able to qualify to the finals via the jury vote. The final was held on 24 February, where the song was declared the winner after winning the public vote.

The song competed in the second semi-final, held on 10 May 2018 in Lisbon, Portugal.

Composition
Viszlát nyár is lyrically about the singer Örs Siklósi's deceased father. The song runs at 164 BPM.

Track listing

Charts

Release history

References

2017 songs
2017 singles
Eurovision songs of 2018
Eurovision songs of Hungary
Post-hardcore songs
Number-one singles in Hungary